Happy Birthday BBC Two is a British entertainment television film that was first broadcast on BBC Two on 20 April 2004 to commemorate the channel's 40th birthday. The film was broadcast again from 16 to 24 April 2014 for the channel's 50th birthday in 2014.

Reception

Ratings
Happy Birthday BBC Two was watched by 2.43 million viewers on 20 April 2004.

Critical reception
Digital Spy and The Guardian recommended watching the 2014 edition of Happy Birthday BBC Two, which was split into four parts.

References

External links
 
 

BBC Two
English-language television shows
2004 films